Haplogroup L0 is a human mitochondrial DNA (mtDNA) haplogroup.

Origin

L0 is one of two branches from the most recent common ancestor (MRCA) for the shared human maternal lineage. The haplogroup consists of five main branches (L0a, L0b, L0d, L0f, L0k). Four of them were originally classified into L1 subclades, L1a, L1d, L1f and L1k.

In 2014, ancient DNA analysis of a 2,330 year old male forager's skeleton in Southern Africa found that the specimen belonged to the L0d2c1c mtDNA subclade. This maternal haplogroup is today most closely associated with the Ju, a subgroup of the indigenous San people, which points to population continuity in the region. In 2016, a Late Iron Age desiccated mummy from the Tuli region in northern Botswana was also found to belong to haplogroup L0.

Distribution

L0 is found most commonly in Sub-Saharan Africa. It reaches its highest frequency in the Khoisan people at 73% on average. Some of the highest frequencies are: Namibia (!Xun) 79%, South Africa (Khwe/!Xun) 83%, and Botswana (!Kung) 100%.

Haplogroup L0d is found among Khoisan groups of Southern Africa closer to the Khoid side with (following L0k) being more Sanid but is largely restricted to the Khoisan as a whole. L0d is also commonly found in sections of the Coloured population of South Africa and frequencies range from 60% to 71%.   This illustrates the massive maternal contribution of Khoisan people to sections of the Coloured population of South Africa.

Haplogroups L0k is the second most common haplogroup in the Khoisan groups closer to the Sanid side with (following L0d) being more Khoid but is largely restricted to the Khoisan as a whole. Although the Khoisan associated L0d haplogroup were found in high frequencies in sections of the Coloured population of South Africa, L0k were not observed in two studies involving large groups of Coloured individuals.

Haplogroup L0f is present in relatively small frequencies in Tanzania, East Africa among the Sandawe people of Tanzania who are older than the Khoisan.

Haplogroup L0a is most prevalent in South-East African populations (25% in Mozambique).
Among Guineans, it has a frequency between 1% and 5%, with the Balanta group showing increased frequency of about 11%. Haplogroup L0a has a Paleolithic time depth of about 33,000 years and likely reached Guinea between 10,000 and 4,000 years ago. It also is often seen in the Mbuti and Biaka Pygmies. L0a is found at a frequency of almost 25% in Hadramawt (Yemen).

Haplogroup L0b is found in Ethiopia.

Drug and disease interactions
In patients who are given the drug stavudine to treat HIV, Haplogroup L0a2 is associated with a higher likelihood of peripheral neuropathy as a side effect.

Subclades

Tree

This phylogenetic tree of haplogroup L0 subclades is based on the paper by Mannis van Oven and Manfred Kayser Updated comprehensive phylogenetic tree of global human mitochondrial DNA variation and subsequent published research.

Most Recent Common Ancestor (MRCA)
L0
L0d
L0d3
L0d1'2
L0d1
L0d1a
L0d1b
L0d1c
L0d1c1
L0d2
L0d2a'b
L0d2a
L0d2a1
L0d2b
L0d2c
L0d2c1c
L0a'b'f'k
L0k
L0k1
L0k2
L0a'b'f
L0f
L0f1
L0f2
L0f2a
L0f2b
L0a'b
L0a
L0a1
L0a1a
L0a1a2
L0a1b
L0a1b1
L0a1b1a
L0a1b2
L0a1c
L0a1d
L0a2
L0a2a
L0a2a1
L0a2a1a
L0a2a1a1
L0a2a1a2
L0a2a2
L0a2a2a
L0a2b
L0a2ba
L0a2c
L0a2d
L0a3
L0a4
L0b

See also

Genealogical DNA test
Genetic genealogy
Human mitochondrial genetics
Population genetics
Human mitochondrial DNA haplogroups

References

External links 
General
Ian Logan's Mitochondrial DNA Site
Mannis van Oven's Phylotree
Haplogroup L0
L0 YFull MTree 1.02.00 (under construction)

L0